The 8th Weapons Squadron is a non-flying United States Air Force unit, assigned to the USAF Weapons School at Nellis Air Force Base, Nevada.

The squadron inherited the lineage of the 8th Airborne Command and Control Squadron. The 8th’s history includes flying cargo aircraft to supply people and munitions around the South Pacific during WWII. Known then as the 8th Combat Cargo Squadron, the unit’s Curtiss C-46 Commandos and Douglas C-47 Skytrains likely shared ramp space with the 433d Fighter Squadron’s (now the F-15C Weapons Squadron) Lockheed P-38 Lightnings in New Guinea and the Philippines in 1944 and 1945. The 8th Airborne Command and Control Squadron flew the EC-135 to provide airborne command and control for deploying fighter squadrons over the Atlantic Ocean, and supporting the movement of key Air Combat Command leadership.

Overview
Provides advanced training for Airborne Warning and Control System and Ground Theater Air Control System officers.  Also includes training to weapons officers for the E-3 Airborne Warning and Control System (AWACS), Command and Reporting Center (CRC), RC-135 Rivet Joint, EC-130H Compass Call and the E-8 Joint Surveillance Target Attack Radar System (JSTARS) communities.

History

World War II
The first predecessor of the squadron was the 8th Ferrying Squadron, which ferried aircraft to combat theaters and to Brazil from the Southeast United States under the lend-lease program using the Air Transport Command South Atlantic air ferry route, Mar 1942-Mar 1944.

The second predecessor of the squadron provided air transportation in Southwestern and Western Pacific, Nov 1944-Sep 1945 as the 8th Combat Cargo Squadron, operating under Fifth Air Force.  It operated from Biak to fly passengers and cargo to bases in Australia, New Guinea, the Admiralties, and the Philippines. Also dropped supplies to US and guerrilla forces in the Philippines.  Moved to Leyte in May 1945. Maintained flights to bases in Australia, New Guinea, and the Philippines; transported personnel and supplies to the Ryukyus, and evacuated casualties on return flights.  Transported personnel and equipment of the occupation forces to Japan and ferried liberated prisoners of war to the Philippines. Moved to Japan in September 1945 where it operated until being inactivated in January 1946.

Helicopter operations
The third predecessor of the squadron was activated as the 8th Helicopter Flight under Caribbean Air Command in 1949.  It operated cargo flights from Albrook Air Force Base providing logistical and supply support to installations in Panama and Latin America, Oct 1949-Feb 1952.

Airborne command and control
Reactivated in 1972 as  EC-135 Airborne command post for tactical deployments worldwide, Feb 1972-May 1996. Has been involved in every United States combat operation since the Vietnam War.   Deployed personnel and equipment to Spain and airfield personnel and equipment into Saudi Arabia, Aug 1990-c. Mar 1991 as part of Operation Desert Shield/Desert Storm.

From 1978
Its current squadron was formed in 1978, when the concept of Air Weapons Controller was added to the established concept of Fighter Weapons.  The first Air Weapons Controllers graduated in December 1984 to become Fighter Weapons School instructors.  Instruction at the 8th Weapons Squadron continues to this very day in the fields of United States Air Force tactical air control system (TACS), Air Battle Management (ABM), Electronic Warfare Support (ES), Electronic attack (EA)  and their integration in operations.  The course has graduated over 350 instructors who have been key to every conflict and contingency since 1985.

Lineage
 8th Ferrying Squadron
 Constituted as the 8th Air Corps Ferrying Squadron on 18 February 1942
 Activated on 24 March 1942
 Redesignated 8th Ferrying Squadron on 12 May 1943
 Disbanded on 31 Mar 1944
 Reconstituted and consolidated with the 8th Tactical Deployment Control Squadron, the 8th Combat Cargo Squadron and the 8th Helicopter Flight as the 8th Tactical Deployment Control Squadron on 19 September 1985

 8th Combat Cargo Squadron
 Constituted as the 8th Combat Cargo Squadron on 25 April 1944
 Activated on 1 May 1944
 Inactivated on 15 January 1946
 Disbanded on 8 October 1948
 Reconstituted and consolidated with the 8th Tactical Deployment Control Squadron, the 8th Ferrying Squadron and the 8th Helicopter Flight as the 8th Tactical Deployment Control Squadron on 19 September 1985

 8th Helicopter Flight
 Constituted as the 8th Helicopter Flight on 7 October 1949
 Activated on 27 October 1949
 Inactivated on 19 February 1952
 Activated on 14 March 1952
 Inactivated on 16 December 1952
 Consolidated with the 8th Tactical Deployment Control Squadron, the 8th Ferrying Squadron and the 8th Combat Cargo Squadron as the 8th Tactical Deployment Control Squadron on 19 September 1985

 8th Weapons Squadron
 Constituted as the 8th Airborne Command and Control Squadron on 14 August 1969
 Activated on 15 October 1969
 Inactivated on 8 March 1971
 Activated on 1 February 1972
 Redesignated 8th Tactical Deployment Control Squadron on 30 April 1974
 Consolidated with the 8th Ferrying Squadron, the 8th Combat Cargo Squadron and the 8th Helicopter Flight on 19 September 1985
 Redesignated 8th Air Deployment Control Squadron on 1 November 1990
 Redesignated 8th Airborne Command and Control Squadron on 1 July 1994
 Inactivated on 15 May 1996
 Redesignated 8th Weapons Squadron on 24 January 2003
 Activated on 3 February 2003

Assignments
 Nashville Sector, Ferrying Command (later Nashville Sector, Domestic Wing, Ferrying Command; 4th Ferrying Group), 24 March 1942 – 31 March 1944
 2d Combat Cargo Group, 1 May 1944 – 15 January 1946 (attached to 5298th Troop Carrier Wing (Provisional), November–December 1944)
 5700th Air Base Group, 27 October 1949 – 19 February 1952
 Eighteenth Air Force (attached to 16th Troop Carrier Squadron), 14 March–16 December 1952
 4500th Air Base Wing, 15 October 1969 – 8 March 1971
 Tactical Air Command, 1 February 1972
 552d Airborne Warning and Control Wing (later 552d Airborne Warning and Control Division; 552d Airborne Warning and Control Wing), 1 January 1978
 28th Air Division, 1 March 1986
 552d Operations Group, 29 May 1992 – 15 May 1996
 USAF Weapons School, 3 February 2003 – present

Stations

 Berry Field, Tennessee, 24 March 1942
 Memphis Municipal Airport, Tennessee, 9 December 1942 – 31 March 1944
 Syracuse Army Air Base, New York, 1 May 1944
 Baer Field, Indiana, 6–27 October 1944
 Finschhafen Airfield, New Guinea, November 1944
 Mokmer Airfield, Biak, New Guinea, January 1945
 Dulag Airfield, Leyte, 19 March 1945
 Okinawa, 25 Aug 1945

 Yokota Air Base, Japan, September 1945 – 15 January 1946
 Albrook Air Force Base, Panama Canal Zone, 27 October 1949 – 19 February 1952
 Sewart Air Force Base, Tennessee, 14 March–16 December 1952
 Langley Air Force Base, Virginia, 15 October 1969 – 8 March 1971
 Seymour Johnson Air Force Base, North Carolina, 1 February 1972
 Tinker Air Force Base, Oklahoma, 15 June 1978 – 15 May 1996
 Nellis Air Force Base, Nevada, 3 February 2003 – present

Aircraft
 None (ferried aircraft), 1942–1944
 Curtiss C-46 Commando, 1944–1945
 Douglas C-47 Skytrain, 1944, 1945
 Sikorsky H-5 Dragonfly, 1949–1952
 Sikorsky H-19 Chickasaw (Helicopter), 1952
 Lockheed EC-121 Warning Star, 1969–1970
 Boeing C-135 Stratolifter, 1969-1972
 Boeing EC-135, 1972-1996

References

Notes

Bibliography

 
 

Weapons 0008
Military units and formations established in 2003